Antonija Tanja Mitrović is a New Zealand computer scientist who was born in Serbia.

Mitrovic did her MSc and PhD at the University of Niš in Niš, Serbia. Before moving to the University of Canterbury in Christchurch, New Zealand and rising to the level of professor.

Mitrovic specialises in artificial intelligence methods in online-learning systems, particularly in modelling the students' understanding based on previous questions and using the model to select future questions.

Selected works
 Evaluation of a constraint-based tutor for a database language A Mitrovic, S Ohlsson University of Canterbury. Computer Science and Software Engineering. 1999
 Optimising ITS behaviour with Bayesian networks and decision theory M Mayo, A Mitrovic. International Journal of Artificial Intelligence in Education. 2001
 An intelligent SQL tutor on the web A Mitrovic. International Journal of Artificial Intelligence in Education 13 (2), 173–197	2003
 A comparative analysis of cognitive tutoring and constraint-based modeling A Mitrovic, KR Koedinger, B Martin User Modeling 2003, 313–322 2003
 Constraint-based tutors: a success story A Mitrovic, M Mayo, P Suraweera, B Martin Engineering of Intelligent Systems, 931–940 2001
 Using evaluation to shape ITS design: Results and experiences with SQL-Tutor A Mitrovic, B Martin, M Mayo User Modeling and User-Adapted Interaction 12 (2–3), 243–279. 2002
 KERMIT: a constraint-based tutor for database modeling P Suraweera, A Mitrovic. Intelligent Tutoring Systems, 377–387	2002
 An intelligent tutoring system for entity relationship modelling P Suraweera, A Mitrovic International Journal of Artificial Intelligence in Education 14 (3), 375–417 2004

References

External links
 google scholar 
 linked-in
 institutional homepage

Living people
New Zealand women academics
Serbian emigrants to New Zealand
New Zealand computer scientists
University of Niš alumni
Academic staff of the University of Canterbury
Serbian academics
Year of birth missing (living people)